Ahmad Kaikaus is a retired Bangladeshi civil servant who is currently alternative Executive Director of World Bank. He served as the Principal Secretary to the Prime Minister of Bangladesh.

Education
Kaikaus completed his bachelors and masters from the University of Chittagong. He completed his second master's at the Center for Development Economics at Williams College. He earned a PhD at the University of Texas at Dallas.

Career
On 21 January 1986, Kaikaus joined the Bangladesh Civil Service in the administrative cadre. He has worked as a Upazila Nirbahi Officer, magistrate and several other positions in the field and central secretariat in the early stages of his career. He served as the chairperson of the Bangladesh Energy and Power Research Council. He taught at the American International University-Bangladesh and Collin College in Texas. 

On 23 February 2017, he was appointed secretary in charge of the Power Division of the Ministry of Power, Energy and Mineral Resources. He worked at the International Food Policy Research Institute for three years as the deputy chief of the Policy Research and Strategy Support Program. In August 2019, he led the Bangladeshi team to the joint steering committee on Bangladesh-India Power Sector Cooperation. He rejected the import of electricity from Tripura, finding its infrastructure inadequate.

On 29 December 2019, he was appointed the Principal Secretary of the Prime Minister's Office under Prime Minister Sheikh Hasina. He was reappointed by the prime minister in December 2020 with a 2-year extension.

References

Living people
Williams College alumni
University of Texas at Dallas alumni
Academic staff of the American International University-Bangladesh
Bangladeshi civil servants
Year of birth missing (living people)